Let's Stay Friends is the fourth full-length album by Les Savy Fav. It was released on September 18, 2007. The album was #5 in NME albums of the year list, #16 on Rolling Stones list of the Top 50 Albums of 2007, and #44 on Pitchforks list.

The song "Raging in the Plague Age" is featured in the video game Grand Theft Auto IV.

Track listing
 "Pots & Pans" – 2:38
 "The Equestrian" – 3:27
 "The Year Before the Year 2000" – 2:26
 "Patty Lee" – 3:51
 "What Would Wolves Do?" – 2:56
 "Brace Yourself" – 4:13
 "Raging in the Plague Age" – 2:43
 "Slugs in the Shrubs" – 2:40
 "Kiss Kiss Is Getting Old" – 3:18
 "Comes & Goes" – 3:01
 "Scotchgard the Credit Card" – 3:06
 "The Lowest Bitter" – 4:20

Credits
Les Savy Fav
 Tim Harrington – vocals
 Seth Jabour – guitar
 Andrew Reuland – guitar
 Syd Butler – bass
 Harrison Haynes – drums

Additional personnel
 Toko Yasuda (vocals) – track: 8, 9
 John Schmersal (vocals) – track: 4
 Nicholas Thorburn (vocals) – track: 3, 5
 Eleanor Friedberger (vocals) – track: 10
 Catherine Herrick (vocals) – track: 4
 Chris Zane (drums) – track: 1, 10
 Matt Schulz (drums) – track: 3, 9
 Joe Plummer (drums) – track: 5
 Fred Armisen (drums) – track: 1, 4, 10
 Anawim "Nawi" Avila (saxophone) – track: 8, 12
 Adelquis E. Salom (trumpet) – track: 12
 Jason B. Silva (trombone) – track: 12
 Emily Haines (piano) – track: 10
 Aleah Robinson (violin) – track: 8

References

2007 albums
Les Savy Fav albums
Frenchkiss Records albums